The State University of Novi Pazar is a public university in Serbia. It was founded in 2006 and organized in ten faculties with headquarters in Novi Pazar.

Organization and academics
The State University of Novi Pazar is governed by the University Council, University Senate and the Rector, who represents the university externally. As of 2018, it has 16 study programs and several departments.

The State University of Novi Pazar is an accredited degree-granting institution, offering bachelor's, master's and doctoral programs in Law, Economics, Serbian Literature and Language, English Language and Literature, Psychology, Mathematics, Mathematics and Physics, Computer Science and Mathematics, Computer Science and Physics, Architecture, Civil Engineering, Computer Technology, Audio and Video Technology, Chemistry, Agricultural Production, Food Processing Technology, Biology, Sports and Physical Education, Rehabilitation, and Fine Arts.

As of 2018–19 school year, together with the International University of Novi Pazar, there are 2,250 students in Novi Pazar.

Campus
The main building is located in Vuk Karadžić Street, Novi Pazar. The Painting Studio is in a separate building. The university also conducts its activities at the Hospital for Muscular and Neuromuscular Diseases and the Novi Pazar Sport Center (pool, sports hall and sport courts).

See also
 Education in Serbia
 List of universities in Serbia

References

External links
 

Educational institutions established in 2006
State University of Novi Pazar
2006 establishments in Serbia